Rottentail is a 2019 American comedy horror film directed by Brian Skiba and starring Dominique Swain, Corin Nemec and Gianni Capaldi. The film is based on the graphic novel of the same name by Kevin Moyers and David C. Hayes.

The film focuses on researcher Peter Cotton (Corin Nemec) who gets bitten by a mutant rabbit, and then transforms into half-man/half-bunny who kills the local town.

Plot
Peter Cotton is a meek fertility researcher. The military believes his genetic work can be used to create super-soldiers. When one of his genetically-engineered rabbits bites him, Cotton is transformed into Rottentail. He returns to his home town, Easter Falls, on Holy Saturday and begins to take revenge on everyone who bullied and wronged him. He eventually starts pursuing the girl who rejected him as a teen.

Cast
 Corin Nemec as Peter Cotten / Rottentail
 Dominique Swain as Anna Banana
 William McNamara as Jake Mulligan
 Gianni Capaldi as Dr. Serius Stanley
 Tank Jones as General Phelps
 Vincent De Paul as Principal Meyers
 Brian Skiba as Billy
 Mark Speno as Dr. Major Donelly
 Elizabeth Isaacson as Church Parishioner
 Laurie Love as Mayor Riggs

Reception
The film has received mostly negative reviews from critics.

Noel Murray from the Los Angeles Times noted that the film is "as goofy as it is gory" and that it is "overlong and the humor’s too broad"

Awards

References

External links

2019 films
American comedy horror films
Films based on American comics
Live-action films based on comics
2010s English-language films
Films directed by Brian Skiba
2010s American films